The 1979–80 Louisville Cardinals men's basketball team represented the University of Louisville during the 1979–80 NCAA Division I men's basketball season, Louisville's 66th season of intercollegiate competition. The Cardinals competed in the Metro Conference and were coached by Denny Crum. The team played home games at Freedom Hall.

The team completed a 33-3 record and brought Louisville basketball their first NCAA national championship when they defeated UCLA 59-54, led by Darrell Griffith and his 23 points.

Roster

Schedule 

|-
!colspan=12| Regular Season

 

 

|-
!colspan=9| 1980 Metro Conference tournament

|-
!colspan=9| 1980 NCAA Division I men's basketball tournament

Rankings

NCAA basketball tournament

Midwest region

Final Four

Awards and honors
 Darrell Griffith, NCAA Men's MOP Award
 Darrell Griffith, All-America selection

Team players drafted into the NBA

References

Louisville Cardinals
Louisville Cardinals men's basketball seasons
NCAA Division I men's basketball tournament championship seasons
NCAA Division I men's basketball tournament Final Four seasons
Louisville
Louisville Cardinals men's basketball, 1979-80
Louisville Cardinals men's basketball, 1979-80